California Suite is a 1978 American comedy film directed by Herbert Ross. The screenplay by Neil Simon is based on his 1976 play of the same name. Similar to his earlier Plaza Suite, the film focuses on the dilemmas of guests staying in a suite in a luxury hotel. Maggie Smith won the Academy Award for Best Supporting Actress for her performance in the film.

Plot
In "Visitors from New York", Hannah Warren is a Manhattan workaholic who flies to Los Angeles to retrieve her teenage daughter Jenny after she leaves home to live with her successful screenwriter father Bill. The bickering, divorced couple are forced to decide what living arrangements are best for the girl.

In "Visitors from London", Diana Barrie is a British actress and a first-time nominee for the Academy Award for Best Actress in an independent British film, an honor that could revive her faltering career, but she knows she has no chance of winning. She is in deep denial about the true nature of her marriage of convenience to Sidney Cochran, a once-closeted gay antique dealer who has become increasingly indiscreet about his sexuality. As she prepares for her moment in the spotlight, her mood fluctuates from hope to panic to despair.

In "Visitors from Philadelphia", conservative, middle-aged businessman Marvin Michaels awakens to discover a prostitute named Bunny - an unexpected gift from his brother Harry - unconscious in his bed. With his wife Millie on her way up to the suite, he must find a way to conceal all traces of his uncharacteristic indiscretion.

In "Visitors from Chicago", Dr. Chauncey Gump and his wife Lola and Dr. Willis Panama and his wife Bettina are taking a much-needed vacation together. Things begin to unravel quickly when everything seems to go wrong, and the two men decide to settle their differences by engaging in a very competitive tennis match.

Cast
 Alan Alda as Bill Warren
 Michael Caine as Sidney Cochran
 Bill Cosby as Dr. Willis Panama
 Jane Fonda as Hannah Warren
 Walter Matthau as Marvin Michaels
 Elaine May as Millie Michaels
 Richard Pryor as Dr. Chauncey Gump
 Maggie Smith as Diana Barrie
 Herb Edelman as Harry Michaels
 Sheila Frazier as Bettina Panama
 Denise Galik as Bunny
 Gloria Gifford as Lola Gump
 Dana Plato as Jenny Warren

Production
The film was shot on location at The Beverly Hills Hotel, the Dorothy Chandler Pavilion at the Los Angeles Music Center, and along Rodeo Drive.

Diana and Sidney's arrival at the Academy Awards was actually shot during the arrivals for the 50th Academy Awards in April 1978. This may explain the muted response from a real-life crowd unfamiliar with the names Diana Barrie and Sidney Cochran.

The California-themed paintings seen in the opening credits are by pop artist David Hockney. While the play featured two actors and two actresses each playing several roles, the film features a different actor for each role.

Critical reception
Vincent Canby of The New York Times called California Suite "the most agreeably realised Simon film in years" and added "Here is Mr. Simon in top form, under the direction of Herbert Ross, one of the few directors...who can cope with the particular demands of material that simultaneously means to be touching and so nonstop clever one sometimes wants to gag him. It all works in California Suite, not only because the material is superior Simon, but also because the writer and the director have assembled a dream cast."

Variety observed "Neil Simon and Herbert Ross have gambled in radically altering the successful format of California Suite as it appeared on stage. Instead of four separate playlets, there is now one semi-cohesive narrative revolving around visitors to the Beverly Hills Hotel...The technique is less than successful, veering from poignant emotionalism to broad slapstick in sudden shifts."

Time Out New York described the film as "quick and varied comedy, highly suited to Neil Simon's machine-gun gag-writing" and added "Fonda provides the film with its centre, giving another performance of unnerving sureness. Also on the credit side is a bedroom farce of epic proportions from Matthau and May. The other vignettes are a bit glum."

Channel 4 stated "It's an expertly crafted slick movie that sets up each of its coconuts and knocks them over with a sure eye, but ultimately it's emotional sushi rather than satisfying catharsis."

In his annual movie guide, Leonard Maltin gave the film three stars out of a possible four, and described it as a "pleasant time-filler, with a nice jazz score by Claude Bolling". He also felt that "gently bickering" Smith and Caine came off best, while "unfunnily combative" Pryor and Cosby came off worst.

The New York Times placed the film on its Best 1000 Movies Ever list.

Awards and nominations

Home media
The film was released on DVD on Region 1 DVD on January 2, 2002. It is in anamorphic widescreen format with audio tracks in English and French and subtitles in English, French, Spanish, Portuguese, Chinese, Korean, and Thai.

See also
Plaza Suite
London Suite (play)

Notes

References

External links
 
 
 

1978 films
1978 comedy films
1978 LGBT-related films
American anthology films
American comedy films
American films based on plays
American LGBT-related films
Columbia Pictures films
1970s English-language films
Films about actors
Films about prostitution in the United States
Films based on works by Neil Simon
Films directed by Herbert Ross
Films featuring a Best Musical or Comedy Actress Golden Globe winning performance
Films featuring a Best Supporting Actress Academy Award-winning performance
Films set in hotels
Films set in Los Angeles
Films shot in California
Films shot in Los Angeles
Films with screenplays by Neil Simon
LGBT-related comedy films
Films scored by Claude Bolling
Films about divorce
Films about screenwriters
1970s American films